The 1994 Victorian Football Association season was the 113th season of the Australian rules football competition; and, it was the final season contested under the administration of the Association as an independent body, before control of the competition was ceded to the Victorian State Football League at the end of the year. The premiership was won by the Sandringham Football Club, after it defeated Box Hill in the grand final on 25 September by nine points; it was the fifth premiership won by the club.

Premiership season
In the home-and-away season, each team played eighteen games; the top five then contested the finals under the McIntyre final five system. Finals were played for the first time at Victoria Park.

Ladder

Finals

Awards
The leading goalkicker for the season was Rino Pretto (Dandenong), who kicked 87 goals including finals.
The J. J. Liston Trophy was won by Cory Young (Oakleigh), who polled 20 votes. Young finished ahead of Justin Crough (Sandringham), who was second with 17 votes, and Shaun Smith (Werribee), who polled 16 votes.
The Fothergill-Round Medal was won by Bruce Cohen (Box Hill).
Sandringham won the reserves premiership for the second consecutive season. Sandringham 15.12 (102) defeated Port Melbourne 10.9 (69) in the grand final, held as a curtain-raiser to the Seniors Grand Final on 25 September. Sandringham also won the Under-19s premiership, giving it the premiership in all three grades for the season.
Frankston won the pre-season competition. Frankston 15.13 (103) defeated Werribee 15.4 (94) in the grand final, held on 9 April.

Notable events

Interleague matches
The Association played one interleague match, against the Northern Territory Football League, during 1994. The match was played on 9 April, making it a pre-season match for the Association, and a post-season match for Northern Territory (which plays its season during the Australian summer), giving Northern Territory a form advantage. Northern Territory defeated the Association by 23 points.

Other notable events
Most of the Association's clubs were in such severe financial difficulty that the Association waived the $25,000 affiliation fee for the season.
Springvale played a couple of night matches at the Newcomen Road Oval during the 1994 season, including the season opening match against Prahran on Friday, 15 April. Springvale had previously hosted night matches as recently as 1978 while it was in the Federal League, but had never staged a night match during its time in the Association.
On Saturday, 7 May, Rino Pretto (Dandenong) kicked his 1000th career goal. Pretto was the second and, as of 2021, last player to reach the goalkicking milestone.
On 4 June, Oakleigh led Werribee by 46 points at half time (14.9 (93) led 7.5 (47)), before Werribee recovered to win by 19 points: Werribee 21.16 (142) d. Oakleigh 18.15 (123).
On 5 June, Coburg 15.9 (99) defeated Prahran 14.9 (93) to end a 30-match losing streak dating back to late 1992.

See also 
 List of VFA/VFL premiers
 Australian Rules Football
 Victorian Football League

References

Victorian Football League seasons
VFL